Dr. Robert G. Rabil is Professor of Political Science at Florida Atlantic University. He holds a masters degree in Government from Harvard University, a PhD in Near Eastern and Judaic Studies from Brandeis University, and an honorary PhD in humanities from the Massachusetts College of Liberal Arts. His area of studies and expertise include Political Islam, Salafism, Transnational and Revivalist Movements, Terrorism, US-Arab Relations, Arab-Israeli Conflict, U.S.-Muslim Relations, and Contemporary Middle East Politics. He is the author of dozens of articles in major academic and professional journals and magazines. His books have been peer-reviewed and highly commended. Rabil served as the Chief of Emergency for the Red Cross in Baabda district, Beirut during Lebanon's civil war, and was project manager of the US State Department-funded Iraq Research and Documentation Project. Rabil was awarded the LLS Distinguished Professorship in Current Events (2012-2013; 2018-2019), LLS Teaching in Excellence Award, and in May 2012 was conferred an honorary Doctorate in Humanities from Massachusetts College of Liberal Arts.

Views 
Rabil has written that the war against Islamist extremism is a war against a triumphalist religious ideology that cloaks itself in the sanctity of the sacred and the history of authentic Islam. Rabil argues that authoritarian or totalitarian Muslim rulers have rarely challenge this triumphalist ideology, for fear of being further delegitimized as impious Muslims. He goes on to say that "the problem for the West in its relationship with a large part of the Muslim world is that this triumphalist religious ideology is more or less left unchallenged by Muslim rulers".

Jihad and the West 
Writing in the Washington Post, Rabil affirms that "Jihad is an ominous word to most Americans, conjuring up images of terrorism. But the word "jihad" in Arabic merely means "to strive" or to make a "determined effort."" But over time, both Shi'a and Sunni Islam have developed distinct distortions of jihad, both of which contribute to the current association we [Americans] have between jihad and terrorist acts. This tie, however, advances a twisted concept with little to do with the mainstream teaching of Islam.

Rabil believes that radical Sunni ideologues, such as Mawdudi, Qutb and Faraj, advanced ideas that distorted the concept of jihad. "They framed efforts to excommunicate secular rulers as an armed struggle against jahili secularism, contesting the mainstream Islamic view that Muslims should submit to political authority in order to prevent strife. Their teachings also transformed jihad into a mandatory, individual obligation for all Muslims."

Syria 
Throughout his extensive research on Syria and the Asad regime, Rabil maintained that the Asad regime, despite its pan-Arab rhetoric, sacrificed Arab nationalism on the altar of the regime's national interest and survival. He underscored that the Asad regime understands only the language of violence in addressing any form of dissent. He argued that the United States had an ambivalent relationship with the Asad regime until the invasion of Iraq.

Carsten Wieland, in reviewing Rabil's work Syria, the United States and the War on Terror in the Middle East, wrote that "as the author points out, US-Syrian relations have experienced many ups and downs. After World War II, the US had an equally good relationship with Syria as with Israel. The rivalry began with the Cold War and the Arab nationalist perception of Israel as a colonial entity. The turning point came in 1967, when the US crystallized as Israel's most faithful ally and the Soviet Union became the main arms supplier for Syria and Egypt. In the mid-1970s, after US Secretary of State Henry Kissinger had mediated the disengagement plan on the Golan Heights, the atmosphere between the United States and Syria became friendlier again. In 1975, Syria's foreign minister 'Abdul Halim Khaddam even was received at the White House, and the United States granted loans and aid to Syria. The Ford and Carter administrations were the champions of this approach, which gave Washington leverage to influence both sides of the conflict.

This changed when Syria appeared on the US State Department's "terrorism list" in 1979, leading to economic sanctions. But US policymakers believed that Syria played a pivotal role in the region. This led to an ambivalent US attitude toward Syria...Terrorism drove the countries apart and at the same time brought them together: Syria helped the US to broker several deals to free US hostages from Lebanese Shi'a and Palestinian terrorists in the 1980s and early 1990s… In 2002, the US State Department conceded that Syria was not directly involved in international terrorist attacks since 1986. But Congress remained unimpressed as long as Syria harbored Palestinian organizations on its soil. The relationship remained contradictory: "[...] inasmuch as the United States wanted to punish Syria for its involvement in terrorism, the United States needed Syria's help in dealing with terrorism," writes Rabil (p. 77). This continued after 9/11, when Syrian intelligence shared valuable information about al-Qa'ida members and helped to save American lives.

After the death of Hafiz al-Asad, the 9/ 11 attacks, and Syria's staunch opposition to the Iraq war the dynamics of US-Syrian relations changed considerably and Syria became part of the extended "axis of evil." Rabil writes: "Ironically, where the senior al-Asad had sacrificed Arab nationalism at the altar of Syria's national interest in general and regime security in particular, the Syrian leadership today has been advancing Arab nationalism with the objective of countering US plans in the region" (p. 135).

Against the background of the Israel-Hizbullah war of July 2006, Rabil's book reads as a good preparation to understand the present dynamics.

Rabil holds that "Washington needs to articulate a Syrian strategy" (p. 198). He speaks of a "dying regime" in Damascus but also warns against a "miscalculated or hubris-laden" campaign against Syria, which could lead to anarchy in the country and promote a new fertile ground for terrorism. This would once more torpedo Washington's anti-terrorism agenda in the Middle East.

Rabil has written a dispassionate and scrupulously researched account of the Middle Eastern dynamics that lie at the center of today's most urgent challenges. Unlike other books that have been written about Syria and US foreign policy, this work stands out in its in-depth treatment of ideological and socio-political conditions in the region. To his credit, Rabil does not view the Levant simply through the lens of US policy; consequently, the title of the book is narrower than the author's actual perspective."

Syrian Rebellion 
Notwithstanding the fact he was strongly critical of the Syrian regime and supported moderate Syrian opposition, Rabil early on recognized the ignorance and naivete' with which regional and international actors dealt with the Syrian crisis. The endemic belief that the Asad regime, similar to that of other Arab regimes, would collapse in matter of months was so unwise.
As Salafi-Jihadi organizations, including ISIS and al-Nusra, came to control the Syrian opposition and once Russia became militarily involved in Syria in support of the Asad regime, Rabil supported U.S. cooperation with Russia as necessary to prevent further chaos in the Middle East. To be sure, Russia has played a vital role in Syria, not only making Moscow's participation in any negotiated settlement indispensable, but also leading the way in trying to broker and set up cease fire agreements and de-escalating conflict zones, respectively.

Iraq 
Rabil, in his capacity as the project manager of Iraq Research and Documentation Project, examined thousands of Iraqi official documents. He, in principle, supported the removal of Saddam Hussein on the basis of the oppressive totalitarian order he created in Iraq.  

Nevertheless, Rabil was deeply suspicious and concerned about the way in which the Pentagon envisioned a new post-Saddam Iraq. He had issues with American support of Ahmad Chalabi-led Iraqi opposition; dismantling the Ba'th party and the Iraqi army; and deploying less than enough American troops to occupy Iraq.

Islamist Terrorism in Europe 
Rabil argued that Muslim extremists have exploited European liberalism.

Rabil believes that London, like other European capitals, has been complacent in curbing the missionary activities of Islamist and Salafist organizations, which dissociate themselves from violence yet promote the ideological path to violence. He argued that "Ominously, these Salafist missionaries, some of whom supported by Arab states of the Persian Gulf, begin their Da'wa (propagation of Islam) with an effort geared not towards the recognition of Islam in France, but rather towards the revival of the practice of Islam, according to their ideology, among Muslims. Next, they promote a legal theory meant to resolve conflicts and issues facing Muslims within the context of Muslim Jurisprudence so that Muslims could retain their identity. Meanwhile, they underscore the ideology of Salafism as the only acceptable manjah (methodology) to living as a Muslim. This has served to place Muslim (Salafi) identity above all others and indirectly promoted the agenda of Salafi-jihadi organizations, be they Al Qaeda, ISIS or Ansar al-Shari'a."

U.S. Foreign Policy 
Rabil embraces a realist/pragmatist approach to U.S. foreign policy, resting on securing U.S. national interests by reconciling the celebration of America's universal values and exceptional nature with the recognition of the reality of the other states' histories, cultures and politics.

Affiliations
Affiliate in Research, Center for Middle Eastern Studies, Harvard University, Cambridge, MA, 1999–present.
Member of the Board of Directors, Iraq Institute for Strategic Studies, Inc., Beirut, Baghdad, London, Washington, DC, 2004–2017.
Advisory Board, Florida Society for Middle East Studies, Boca Raton, Florida, 2004–present.
Adjunct Scholar, The Washington Institute for Near East Policy, Washington, DC, 2005-2009.
Academic Adviser, American Lebanese Coalition and World Lebanese Cultural Union, 2003–2014.
Academic Adviser, Central Naval Analysis,2006–2017.
Academic Adviser, Middle East and National Security Organization, an FAU student club which promotes awareness of Middle East and US national security issues.

Bibliography

References

Florida Atlantic University faculty
Brandeis University alumni
American political writers
Year of birth missing (living people)
Living people
American scholars of Islam
American Red Cross personnel
American political scientists
Massachusetts College of Liberal Arts alumni
Harvard University alumni
